The following is a list of all the members of the Grateful Dead. The list does not include members of the various reunion projects.

Members

Jerry Garcia
Active: 1965–1995
Instruments: Lead and Rhythm guitar, lead and backing vocals
Other projects: Jerry Garcia Band, Jerry Garcia Acoustic Band, Legion of Mary, Reconstruction, Old & In the Way, New Riders of the Purple Sage

Bob Weir
Active: 1965–1995
Instruments: Lead and Rhythm guitar, lead and backing vocals
Other projects: RatDog, Kingfish, Bobby and the Midnites, The Other Ones, The Dead, Furthur, Dead & Company

Phil Lesh
Active: 1965–1995
Instruments: Bass guitar, backing and lead vocals
Other projects: Phil Lesh and Friends, The Other Ones, The Dead, Furthur

Bill Kreutzmann
Active: 1965–1995
Instruments: Drums, percussion
Other projects: SerialPod, Rhythm Devils, The Other Ones, The Dead, BK3, 7 Walkers, Billy & the Kids, Dead & Company

Mickey Hart
Active: 1967–1971; 1974–1995
Instruments: Drums, percussion
Other projects: Rhythm Devils, The Other Ones, The Dead, Mickey Hart Band, Dead & Company

Ron "Pigpen" McKernan
Active: 1965 – June 17, 1972 (sick leave September–November 1971)
Instruments: Keyboards, harmonica, percussion, lead and backing vocals

Tom Constanten
Active: November 23, 1968 – January 30, 1970 (touring musician September 1967 – November 1968)
Instruments: Keyboards

Keith Godchaux
Active: September 1971 – February 17, 1979
Instruments: Keyboards, backing vocals
Other projects: Jerry Garcia Band, Heart of Gold Band

Donna Jean Godchaux
Active: December 31, 1971 – February 17, 1979 (maternity leave November–December 1973)
Instruments: Backing and lead vocals
Other projects: Jerry Garcia Band, Heart of Gold Band, Donna Jean Godchaux Band, Dark Star Orchestra

Brent Mydland
Active: April 22, 1979 – July 23, 1990
Instruments: Keyboards, backing and lead vocals
Other projects: Bobby and the Midnites, Go Ahead

Vince Welnick
Active: September 7, 1990 – 1995
Instruments: Keyboards, backing and lead vocals
Other projects: The Tubes, Missing Man Formation

Band lineups
Over a span of 30 years the Grateful Dead had various combinations of members, as shown in the table.

Timeline

References

 
Grateful Dead